Likoma is the main town on Likoma Island in Malawi. It is the administrative capital of Likoma District.

Perhaps the most famous attraction of Likoma is the Anglican Cathedral of Likoma. The cathedral is dedicated to Saint Peter, whose statue faces Lake Malawi. The cathedral was built mostly with stones. The foundation stone of the Cathedral was laid by Bishop Gerard Trower on 27 January 1903 and was consecrated by Bishop Thomas Cathrew Fisher on 14 November 1911. Considered a feat of engineering, materials for its construction were imported from many countries.

References 

Populated places in Northern Region, Malawi